Sault Falls (also called Dennery Falls and Errard Falls) is a  high waterfall near Dennery in Saint Lucia.

External links
Sault Falls (Dennery, St Lucia) at World of Waterfalls

Tourist attractions in Saint Lucia
Waterfalls of North America